The Nazhvan Forest Park is one of the few gardens in Isfahan, which has been rather safe from expansion and development of the city and freshens the air of Isfahan. The word  consists of two words , which means "poplar" in Persian and van, which is a Persian suffix  for place. Therefore  means "a place for poplars". Nazhvan has an area of 1200 ha and is located in the western part of the city. It's the only remaining part of the green space in the suburban area of Isfahan. It plays the role of Isfahan's lungs and has a special importance from the bio-environmental point of view for the city. Zayanderud river flows through the middle of the garden and this is one of the distinguished features of Nazhvan that makes it different from other parks in Isfahan. As parts of the Project for prosperity of Nazhvan, the local government of Isfahan created facilities in Nazhvan as nearby recreational area like sport grounds, a swimming pool, a campsite, playgrounds for children, also facilities for horse droshky, horse sport, boating and cycling.

Gallery

References

Isfahan
Parks in Iran
Tourist attractions in Isfahan